Panimávida Airport  was an airstrip  east of Panimávida, a town in the Maule Region of Chile.

Google Earth Historical Imagery (2/7/2006) shows a  grass runway. The (12/13/2010) image and later show the field contour plowed for crops.

See also

Transport in Chile
List of airports in Chile

References

External links 
OpenStreetMap - Panimávida Airport

Defunct airports
Airports in Chile
Airports in Maule Region